Balls Deep is a documentary series airing on Viceland that follows host Thomas Morton, a journalist and contributing editor for Vice magazine.
     
The series explored its beginnings by airing only three webisodes in 2007 on VBS.tv, an online television network owned by Vice Media, which was later absorbed into Vice.com. Vice Media subsequently aired three more webisodes over the course of the next four years. Even though only seven webisodes were aired over five years via VBS.tv, Vice Media and Thomas Morton continued to be involved in immersive journalism with documentaries such as Garbage Island (the Great Pacific garbage patch), the MTV series The Vice Guide to Everything, Toxic Amazon, and the Emmy Award Winning HBO series Vice airing Friday nights at 11pm ET / 10pm CT.

According to Morton, "There are 7 billion lives happening right now. Including my own. Once I personally experience how the rest of the planet lives on a daily basis, I should finally understand humanity and myself."

Episodes

Webisodes (2007–2012) 
The webisodes were originally aired on VBS.tv, an online television network later absorbed into VICE.com.

Season 1 (2016) 
The season started airing on Viceland on February 29, 2016.

Season 2 (2016) 
The season started airing on Viceland on October 27, 2016.

References

External links 
 Viceland Programming

2000s American documentary television series
2010s American documentary television series
Viceland original programming